George Wendell "Yank" Tandy (November 27, 1893 – May 11, 1969) was an American football center in the National Football League. He played college football for the North Carolina Tar Heels of the University of North Carolina, and was selected All-Southern. One Dr. R. B. Lawson picked Tandy as a center on his all-time North Carolina football team.

References

1893 births
1969 deaths
American football centers
Cleveland Tigers (NFL) players
North Carolina Tar Heels football players
Rochester Jeffersons players
All-Southern college football players
People from Morgan County, Illinois
Players of American football from Illinois
American football drop kickers